The 2014 Korean FA Cup, known as the 2014 Hana Bank FA Cup, was the 19th edition of the Korean FA Cup. In 2013, South Korea's Ministry of Employment and Labor hosted the National Works Club Championship for the first time, and gave qualifications for the 2014 Korean FA Cup to its top four teams. Seongnam FC became champions and qualified for the 2015 AFC Champions League.

Schedule

Teams

Qualifying rounds

First round
The draw for the first round was held on 28 February 2014.

Second round
The draw for the second round was held on 26 March 2014.

Final rounds

Bracket

Round of 32
The draw for the round of 32 was held on 15 April 2014.

Round of 16
The draw for the round of 16 was held on 2 June 2014.

Quarter-finals
The draw for the quarter-finals was held on 22 July 2014.

Semi-finals
The draw for the semi-finals was held on 26 August 2014.

Final

Top scorers

Awards

Main awards

Man of the Round

See also
2014 in South Korean football
2014 K League Classic
2014 K League Challenge
2014 Korea National League
2014 K3 Challengers League

References

External links
Official website
Fixtures & Results at KFA

Korean FA Cup seasons
FA Cup